The Cohens and the Kellys in Atlantic City is a 1929 American silent comedy film directed by William James Craft and starring George Sidney, Vera Gordon and Mack Swain. It is the third entry in the series which began with The Cohens and Kellys, inspired by a play by Aaron Hoffman. Location shooting took place in Atlantic City. Originally shot entirely as a silent, some sound sequences were later added at Universal Studios.

Synopsis
Cohen and Kelly's bathing suit business is struggling financially as they have grown old-fashioned after thirty years. While they are away their respective children Rosalinde and Tom launch a new line of merchandise and promote with a planned beauty contest in the resort of Atlantic City.

Cast
 George Sidney as Nathaniel Cohen
 Vera Gordon as Melitta Cohen
 Mack Swain as 	Mr. Tom Kelly
 Kate Price as 	Mary Kelly
 Cornelius Keefe as 	Tom Kelly Jr.
 Nora Lane as Rosalinde Cohen
 Virginia Sale as 	Selma Meyer
 Tom Kennedy as 	Crook
 Walter Brennan as Man at Police Station

References

Bibliography
 Koszarski, Richard. Hollywood on the Hudson: Film and Television in New York from Griffith to Sarnoff. Rutgers University Press, 2008.

External links

1929 films
American silent feature films
1929 comedy films
Films directed by William James Craft
Silent American comedy films
Films set in Atlantic City, New Jersey
Films shot in Atlantic City, New Jersey
Universal Pictures films
Atlantic City
American black-and-white films
American sequel films
1920s American films